The Morocco national basketball team represents Morocco in international basketball competitions. The team is governed by the Moroccan Royal Basketball Federation, also known as the FRMBB. The team has appeared at the FIBA AfroBasket 20 times and has won the gold medal in the 1965 tournament. In 1968, Morocco finished as runners-up.

Tournament record

Olympic Games
 1968 Mexico City: 16th

African championship
 Egypt 1962 : 3rd
 Morocco 1964 : 2nd
 Tunisia 1965 : Champion
 Morocco 1968 : 2nd
 Senegal 1972 : 7th
 Senegal 1978 : 5th
 Morocco 1980 : 3rd
 Angola 1989 : 9th
 Egypt 1992 : 10th
 Algeria 1995 : 6th
 Angola 1999 : 11th
 Morocco 2001 : 6th
 Egypt 2003 : 8th
 Algeria 2005 : 6th
 Angola 2007 : 10th
 Libya 2009 : 12th
 Madagascar 2011 : 8th
 Côte d'Ivoire 2013 : 8th
 Tunisia 2015 : 13th
 Senegal/Tunisia 2017 : 4th

Mediterranean Games
 2005 Almería: 8th

Team

Current roster
At the AfroBasket 2017:

Head coach position
 Moncho Monsalve – 2001
 Jean-Paul Rabatet
 Hassan Hachad – 2011–2013 
 Said El Bouzidi – 2017

Past rosters
Team for the 2013 FIBA Africa Championship.

At the AfroBasket 2015:

Head coaches
 Naoufal Uariachi
 Said El Bouzidi
 Labib El Hamrani (June 2021–present)

References

External links
Official website
FIBA Prfile

Men's national basketball teams
 
Basketball